Mastax euanthes is a species of beetle in the family Carabidae with restricted distribution in Sri Lanka.

References

Mastax euanthes
Beetles described in 1924
Beetles of Asia